The Sandrock Formation is a geological formation in England, part of the Lower Greensand Group, it is found on the Isle of Wight and in the northern part of Swanage Bay. It consists of a cyclic rhythm of sandstones, siltstones, and mudstones.

References 

Geologic formations of England
Lower Cretaceous Series of Europe
Albian Stage
Aptian Stage
Sandstone formations
Siltstone formations
Mudstone formations